Tarlechia Creek is a stream in the U.S. state of Mississippi.

Tarlechia is a name derived from either the Choctaw language or Chickasaw language purported to mean either (sources vary) "place where palmettos are" or "where rocks are".

References

Rivers of Mississippi
Rivers of Prentiss County, Mississippi
Mississippi placenames of Native American origin